Wilfredo José Rodríguez (born March 20, 1979) is a former Major League Baseball relief pitcher. He appeared in two games for the Houston Astros in the  season. He bats and throws left-handed.

With Houston, Rodríguez posted a 0–0 record with three strikeouts and a 15.00 ERA in three innings. He is most widely known for yielding Barry Bonds' record-tying 70th home run on October 4, 2001. That game was his last appearance in the majors.

He posted a 12.79 ERA in three games.

See also
 List of Major League Baseball players from Venezuela

References

External links

Pelota Binaria (Venezuelan Winter League)

1979 births
Living people
Brevard County Manatees players
Caribes de Anzoátegui players
Edmonton Trappers players
Frisco RoughRiders players
Gulf Coast Astros players
Harrisburg Senators players
Houston Astros players
Kissimmee Cobras players
Leones del Caracas players
Major League Baseball pitchers
Major League Baseball players from Venezuela
Navegantes del Magallanes players
Oklahoma RedHawks players
People from Ciudad Bolívar
Quad Cities River Bandits players
Round Rock Express players
San Angelo Colts players
Venezuelan expatriate baseball players in Canada
Venezuelan expatriate baseball players in the United States
Winnipeg Goldeyes players